The Taiwan Mochi Museum is a museum about mochi (rice cake) in Nantou City, Nantou County, Taiwan.

History
The museum was established in 2011. In 2012, it won the championship of the 2012 Most Famous Tourist Factory in Taiwan.

Architecture
The museum houses the factory to produce mochi. The education tours for the museum is located at the upper floor of the museum.

Activities
The museum features various activities such as mochi tasting and mochi making workshops.

See also
 List of museums in Taiwan

References

External links
 麻糬蛋糕捲 

2011 establishments in Taiwan
Food museums in Taiwan
Industry museums in Taiwan
Museums established in 2011
Museums in Nantou County